SCM file may refer to:
 A StarCraft map file
A Supreme Commander game 3D model file
 A lotus ScreenCam Screencast file
 An XML schema file
 A Scheme source file
 A TinyScheme script
 A GNU Privacy Guard script (modified TinyScheme)